Lucky Stores is an American supermarket chain founded in San Leandro, California, in 1935. Lucky is currently operated by Albertsons in Utah and Save Mart Supermarkets in Northern California.

In 1998, Lucky's parent company, American Stores, was taken over by Albertsons, and by 1999, the Lucky brand had disappeared. On January 23, 2006, SuperValu, CVS Pharmacy and an investment group led by Cerberus Capital Management announced they had agreed to acquire Albertsons for $17.4 billion. Existing Albertsons stores were divided between Supervalu and the Cerberus-led group; the Cerberus-acquired stores became Albertsons, which then sold its Northern California and Northern Nevada stores to Save Mart Supermarkets.

In 2006, both SuperValu and Save Mart began re-branding some Albertsons locations as Lucky stores, using the old logo. However, the same year, Grocery Outlet, an unrelated Northern California retailer, also began branding some of its stores as Lucky, claiming that Albertsons had given up rights to the Lucky trademark when it retired the brand in 1999.  On January 4, 2009, a federal judge ruled against Grocery Outlet, finding that Albertsons had continued to use the name Lucky even after the re-branding of its stores.

SuperValu positioned Lucky as "true neighborhood stores", meaning they meet the unique needs of communities by providing the right products and assortment at the right price."

History

Beginning

Lucky Stores was founded by Charles Crouch as Peninsula Stores Limited in 1931 with the acquisition of Piggly Wiggly stores in Burlingame, San Mateo, Redwood City, Palo Alto and San Jose. By 1935, seven more stores had been added, including the company's first stores in the East Bay, in Berkeley and Oakland.

Lucky had a big influence in transitioning from small store to supermarket.

Its first flagship store opened in 1947 in San Leandro, California. It featured a coffee shop and other conveniences. Also known as "Lucky #50", this store was managed for years by San Leandro native Anthony (Tony) Minniti. Mr. Minniti was known for his old-fashioned approach that emphasized customer service. Tony enjoyed having a personal rapport with many customers over the years, and maintained a highly profitable store during his tenure. After his retirement, the store's customer base (and profitability) declined over time. It was the last Lucky Store to be re-branded after the takeover by Albertsons. Because of dwindling profits, it closed in 2005.

Lucky grew by acquisition in many markets including Big Bear Stores and Mayfair (Seattle), Jim Dandy and Food Basket (Southern California), Kash n' Karry (Florida), and Eagle Food Centers (Illinois). Many chains were operated under their old names for several years after their takeovers.

Lucky stores in the Seattle market were sold to Associated Grocers in 1985. Lucky lacked a distribution center in Washington State and felt that it was impractical to continue to serve the market from Californian distribution and manufacturing facilities.  Associated Grocers would rename the stores from their co-op owned stores and other independent markets.

Subsidiaries

Throughout the 1960s and 1970s, Lucky Stores operated the Gemco department stores in California, Nevada, Phoenix, Tucson, and Houston and Memco in the Chicago and Washington, D.C., areas. In 1983 Lucky closed five Houston-area Gemco discount stores. The Memco stores in the Chicago metropolitan area were converted to Eagle Food Centers and subsequently closed. Lucky acquired Hancock Fabrics in 1972. Due to a 1986 hostile takeover bid by Asher Edelman, many Gemco stores were sold to Dayton-Hudson or closed, while Hancock Fabrics was sold as a public company and Kragen Auto Parts was sold to form CSK Auto. Lucky also owned 22 Mays Drugs in Illinois, Iowa and Wisconsin. A lot of them were next to Eagle Food Stores. They were closed or sold in the late '70s. The Mays Drugs stores in Iowa were sold in 1980 to Revco Discount Drug Stores of Twinsburg, Ohio.

Lucky Stores operated 22 Houston-area Eagle Supermarkets until March 1985, when it was decided to exit the market altogether. Twenty stores were sold to competitors and two were closed. Eagle Supermarkets had a 6 percent share of supermarket sales in Houston one year earlier. That put it behind Kroger, Safeway, Randalls, and Fiesta Mart, but ahead of Rice Food Markets and Gerland's Food Fair.

Marketing
During the 1980s and 1990s, TV personality Stephanie Edwards was a spokeswoman appearing in television commercials for Lucky stores. The marketing department was known as LuGem Advertising until 1986, located within the distribution center in Buena Park, California.

Acquisition by American Stores and Albertsons
By 1988, Lucky became a part of American Stores Company, along with Jewel-Osco, Acme Markets, Alpha Beta, Buttrey Food & Drug, Osco Drug, Sav-on Drugs, and Star Market. The Alpha Beta stores in Northern California became Lucky Stores. The Southern California branches were sold to Ralphs. Some Lucky Stores with pharmacies changed their name to Lucky-Sav-on as part of the merger.

In 1997, American Stores Company sold the Central California Lucky Stores to Save Mart Supermarkets.

In 1998, American Stores was bought out by Albertsons, which became briefly the largest grocery retailer in the United States, but became second after Kroger acquired Fred Meyer the following month. In the year that followed, all Lucky Stores took the Albertsons name, and the Lucky brand was phased out, in order to avoid confusion.

Return

Grocery Outlet return

In 2006, Berkeley, California-based Grocery Outlet closed its Rocklin, California, location, only to re-open the store with the Lucky name and the classic Lucky logo. On April 1, 2005, the Sacramento Bee, interviewing Grocery Outlet President and COO Bob Tiernan, reported that the "company believes the Lucky brand has value. And the new store format, with an 'every day low pricing' strategy, reminds us of Lucky". Grocery Outlet lawyer Peter Craigie noted that Albertsons has indicated its belief that it continues to own the Lucky brand. However, Grocery Outlet believes that Albertsons' failure to utilize the brand means the company has effectively surrendered the trademark. Grocery Outlet has preemptively filed a lawsuit against Albertsons seeking a declaration from Albertsons that the company has surrendered the brand.

On the next day, April 2, Albertsons filed a request for a temporary restraining order for Grocery Outlet's usage of the Lucky mark. At the same time, on the Albertsons homepage, the Lucky trademark reappeared, seemingly as evidence for the mark's use.

The request was denied by the District Court on April 5. Albertsons had argued that it did not intend to abandon the Lucky brand and that Lucky shopping carts still remained at some of its stores. District Judge Jeffrey White ruled that Albertsons failed to demonstrate that the use of the Lucky brand demonstrated unfair competition and that the burden to prove otherwise was wholly the responsibility of Albertsons.

On July 20, the District Court ruled in Albertsons' favor, granting a preliminary injunction preventing Grocery Outlet from using the Lucky name. Grocery Outlet asked the judge to put the order on hold and appealed to the United States Court of Appeals for the Ninth Circuit. The appeals court upheld the ruling in favor of Albertsons on August 9, 2007, and finished the case against Grocery Outlet on January 4, 2009. The Rocklin store in question has since closed and reemerged years later in the mid-2010s as a Grocery Outlet in a shopping center in the western edge of town.

SuperValu return, Cerberus acquisition and entry into Utah

Lucky returned in the summer of 2006. When they opened, the new stores did not have rewards cards, did not advertise specials, and did not offer delivery, emphasizing consistently low prices instead. The stores targeted the budget-minded home cook.

In July 2006, Max Foods stores in Alhambra, El Centro, and San Ysidro were rebranded as Lucky by SuperValu. The Max Foods store in Montebello, California, was renovated and re-opened as Albertsons. The Albertsons store one block away closed and became a Smart and Final. The Lucky store in Alhambra closed four years later.

By October 2006, one Albertsons in North Las Vegas, Nevada, had been rebranded as a Lucky, as well as another in Las Vegas.

According to company officials in 2007, no additional changeovers were planned, but depending on how the stores did, there might be a "handful" of additional changeovers.

In February 2009, SuperValu announced the closing of 9 of its Albertsons' Southern California locations. Albertsons stores in South Gate, Van Nuys and Oxnard were converted to Lucky, although in 2013, the Van Nuys store closed down and was bought by the unrelated Super King chain of Southern California.

In 2013, Cerberus Capital Management acquired the Albertsons stores from SuperValu, including the Lucky stores under Albertsons control.

In 2018, Lucky entered Utah when two stores in Salt Lake City and West Valley City under Albertsons' no-frills soon-to-be defunct banner Super Saver were converted to Lucky. Later conversions also include an operating Albertsons in Tooele and a vacant store in West Jordan that previously operated as an Albertsons several years prior.

In 2020, the last remaining Lucky store in Southern California, in South Gate, closed, ending Lucky's presence in Southern California for the second time.

Save Mart Supermarkets return
Save Mart Supermarkets acquired the Northern California division of Albertsons on November 27, 2006, which included the right to use the Lucky brand in the areas Albertsons operated. In summer 2007, Save Mart converted 72 of the acquired Albertsons stores to the Lucky banner in the San Francisco Bay Area, despite Grocery Outlet's assertion that Save Mart had no rights to the name.

Lucky California concept

On July 8, 2015, after a storewide renovation, the Lucky store in Daly City, California reopened and was rebranded as "Lucky California". Nicole Pesco, Save Mart's Co-President and Chief Strategy and Branding Officer, said the new concept store is "a fusion of Bay Area culture and California sourced and grown, presented with meal solutions at competitive prices."

Save Mart expected and has mostly succeeded to renovate and rebrand 72 other stores throughout the San Francisco Bay Area.  Stores are being redesigned to offer consumers more choices, be a one-stop shop to compete with growing competition and encourage shoppers to venture through the store.

Controversy
In October and November 2011, 23 Northern Californian self-checkout machines had been tampered with, resulting in the loss of thousands of dollars by Lucky's customers.

References

Sources

External links
  (Save Mart-owned stores)
  (Albertsons-owned stores)
 Groceteria.com: History of Lucky Stores

Supermarkets of the United States
Companies based in San Leandro, California
Companies based in Stanislaus County, California
American companies established in 1935
Retail companies established in 1935
Retail companies disestablished in 1999
1935 establishments in California
1999 disestablishments in California
Defunct companies based in the San Francisco Bay Area
Cerberus Capital Management companies
Skaggs family
Supermarkets based in California